Lovely Rivals (lit. "Female teacher vs. female student") is a 2004 South Korean comedy film about a harsh teacher and her headstrong 5th grade student who battle for the affection of the school's handsome new teacher. The film attracted 1,175,580 admissions in 2004.

The scene in which the character Yeo Mi-ok is caught on camera slapping her student was based on a similar real-life incident from earlier in the year in which a teacher repeatedly punched a student in the face.

Plot 
On the first day of the new elementary school year in Korea, Ms. Yeo Mi-ok (Yum Jung-ah) lays down the law to her students. She is strict and demanding. When her new student Go Mi-nam (Lee Se-young) arrives late and calmly takes her seat, Yeo ignores Mi-nam. Assigned bathroom cleaning duty as punishment, Mi-nam beats up the girls who taunt her and forces them to clean instead. At home we see that Mi-nam lives with her mother, who rarely has time for her because of the hours she must work at the food and alcohol tent she owns.

Back at school, the newest male teacher Mr. Kwon Sang-min (Lee Ji-hoon) is causing a stir with his handsome good looks, and every female teacher and student is falling for him. Mi-nam tries to apologize and unburden herself to Ms. Yeo, who ignores her while trying to impress Mr. Kwon. Mi-nam decides to compete for him as well, even getting his cellphone number. Mr. Kwon goes to Ms. Yeo for advice on how to deal with the students' affection, not realizing she likes him too. The teacher and the student start a heated rivalry that climaxes when Ms. Yeo slaps Mi-nam in class—and is recorded doing so on a student's cellphone camera.

She resigns from the school but eventually makes amends with Mi-nam and returns to teach.

Cast
Yum Jung-ah - Yeo Mi-ok 
Lee Se-young - Go Mi-nam 
Lee Ji-hoon - Kwon Sang-min
Byun Hee-bong - Principal Byun In-chul 
Lee Won-jong - traffic police officer 
Na Moon-hee - Mi-ok's mother
Choi Ran - Mi-nam's mother
Kim Eung-soo - vice principal
Choi Bo-kwang - Jang Soo-kyung
Lee Jae-gu - Kim Joon-sung
Kim Ga-eun - Grade 5 Class 2 female student  
Im Won-hee - man in TV drama (cameo)
Cha Seung-won - Teacher Kim Bong-doo (cameo)

References

External links
 
 
 

2004 films
2004 comedy-drama films
Films about educators
2000s Korean-language films
South Korean comedy-drama films
CJ Entertainment films
2004 comedy films
2004 drama films
2000s South Korean films